Paul Rigot (born February 10, 1995) is a French professional basketball player for ADA Blois of the LNB Pro A.

In 2010, he goes to the Centre Fédéral de Basket-ball. He plays with the National 1 squad from the 2011-2012 season. At the end of the 2012-2013 season, he left INSEP.

In May 2013, he worked out with Olivier Yao-Delon at JDA Dijon but Yao-Delon was retained. On June 8, 2013, he joined CSP Limoges. Between 2013 and 2015, he played some matches with the professionals.

On July 4, 2015, he signed to BC Orchies in ProB.

In August 2016, he took part in the AS Monaco preparation camp to obtain a contract. On September 10, 2016, he committed with Monaco. The Monaco squad is of good quality and Rigot managed to make a place for itself.

In June 2017, Rigot joined the Antibes Sharks where he signed a two-year contract.

Rigot played for ALM Evreux Basket during the 2019-20 season. He averaged 12 points, 6 rebounds and 2 assists per game and was the top shooter in Pro B, making 48 percent of his three-point attempts. On June 4, 2020, he joined BCM Gravelines-Dunkerque.

References 

1995 births
Living people
ADA Blois Basket 41 players
AS Monaco Basket players
BCM Gravelines players
BC Orchies players
French men's basketball players
Limoges CSP players
Olympique Antibes basketball players
Small forwards
Sportspeople from Le Mans
21st-century French people